Panayakurichy  is a village in Tiruchirappalli taluk of Tiruchirappalli district in Tamil Nadu, India.

Demographics 

As per the 2001 census, Panayakurichy had a population of 2,445 with 1,244 males and 1,201 females. The sex ratio was 965 and the literacy rate, 85.87.

References 

 

Villages in Tiruchirappalli district